A stud finder (also stud detector or stud sensor) is a handheld device used with wood buildings to locate framing studs located behind the final walling surface, usually drywall. While there are many different stud finders available, most fall into two main categories: magnetic stud detectors and electric stud finders. There are also some devices employing radar.

History
Stud finders have been in use since the early 20th century, and the first ones were all magnetic, relying on internal magnets to detect the walling fasteners or nails presumably attached to studs.

In 1977, Robert Franklin designed an electronic stud finder that relied on an internal capacitor to measure changes in density behind the walling. His patent was put into production by the Zircon Corporation, which became the sole producer of electronic stud finders until the patent expired in 1998. While novel, these electronic stud finders did not always prove effective in locating studs.

Since 1998, many developments and improvements have been made to the internal capacitor stud finders and increased their popularity. Recent developments include stud finders with multiple sensor plates that sense the wall in multiple places. These sensors can indicate the location, width, and lack of studs simultaneously. With more sensors, these stud finders do not require calibration and adapt better to inconsistencies in wall construction.

As of 2013, a few stud finders were available on the market based on ultra-wideband radar scanners for sensors. They are based on the micropower impulse radar as the underlying technology, and stud finders using this technology was invented by Thomas McEwan and patented in 1995.

Magnetic stud detectors
Magnetic stud detectors use magnets to locate metal in the walling material because the magnet is attracted to the metal. The attraction grows stronger as the magnet gets closer to the metal in the walling. The strongest attraction point, if due to a metal fastener in the wall, should indicate the location of a stud.

Magnetic stud detectors may be less useful in homes built with metal mesh lath and plaster. The metal mesh will confuse the signal of an electronic stud finder.

Stationary magnetic detectors
Stationary magnet stud detectors use a small stationary magnet to detect the nails or screws placed into studs while putting up the walling material. The user must move the magnet around the wall until feeling the pull of magnetic attraction, and move in the direction of attraction. Since stationary magnetic stud detectors rely on the user to feel the attraction they can be unreliable, especially when the metal fasteners are located more deeply in the walling, which decreases the overall attraction. When fasteners are deep or buried under thicker walling material (as in most plaster walls) the effectiveness of stationary magnets is considerably lower.

Moving magnetic detectors
Moving magnet stud detectors use a neodymium magnet that is suspended in an enclosure and free to move in response to hidden metal. The strength of this rare earth magnet and the easy movement of the magnet allow moving magnetic stud detectors to work on a broad range of construction types. The magnet is suspended in such a way that it always sits in its "home" position until it is moved directly over a metal fastener or metal stud. On walls with shallow fasteners, the magnet moves towards the wall with such velocity that it makes a distinct thud sound when it hits the wall. Because a moving magnet is not dependent on the operator to feel the attraction to the metal, fasteners buried more deeply under plaster or tile can be located with this detector. For deeper fasteners, the sound is softer since the speed of movement is slower.

Electronic stud finders
Electronic stud finders rely on sensors that detect changes in the dielectric constant of the wall. The dielectric constant changes when the sensor is over a stud. The lower reading indicates the presence of a stud in the wall. Internal capacitor stud finders can also come with other features that locate metal and live AC voltage.

Electronic stud finders currently come in three types: edge finders, center finders, and instant finders.

Edge finders
Edge finders are the most basic internal capacitor detectors. Edge finders detect the edges of the stud or other material behind the walling. This finder must first be calibrated over an empty section of the wall, and then it can be moved along the wall until it senses a change in density - such as the edge of a stud. Edge finders should be moved from both directions to find both edges of the stud. The single sensor in edge finders can be prone to error, sometimes indicating a spot 25 mm (1 in) or more from the stud's edge. Once both edges have been marked, the user must determine the location of the stud's center.

Center finders
Center stud finders detect the center of the stud by using two sensors that register separate readings of the wall’s dielectric constant. When the two readings match, the finder indicates that it is centered on a stud. The several readings are used to determine the target center. Center finders only need to be moved from one direction. Like edge finders, center finders require calibration. Wall texturing can cause bumpy movement across the wall impairing the calibration readings.

Instant stud finders
Instant stud finders are a more recent development. Instant stud finders have multiple sensor plates, and do not need to be moved across the wall to detect a stud, overcoming the effects of bumpy wall texture. They use an algorithm to analyze the readings from the multiple sensor plates for a quicker, more accurate indication. Instant stud finders sense multiple regions of a wall simultaneously including the center of a stud, edges of the stud, and regions without studs. Instant stud finders will indicate varied widths of studs and the location of multiple studs at the same time.

Because the instant stud finders use multiple readings to determine the location of studs they are also less vulnerable to construction anomalies (such as uneven paint, wall textures, wallpaper, uneven plaster, etc.) that can disorient center and edge finders.

Radar scanners

The newest stud finders in the industry implement radar technology. Using raw signals transmitted by their sensors, they are able to classify different wall types as well as the material behind the walls. This allows for detection of studs, pipes, wires, leaks and even motion such as pests or rodents. One of their advantages is the ability to work on older houses, such as ones with lath and plaster wall types.

References

Woodworking tools